Nameless may refer to:

Film, television and comics 
 Nameless (1923 film), a film directed by Michael Curtiz
 Nameless (2021 film), a Rwandan drama film directed by Mutiganda Wa Nkunda
 The Nameless (film), a 1999 Spanish horror film
 Timebomb (1991 film) (working title Nameless), an American film by Avi Nesher
 "Nameless" (Grimm), a television episode
 Nameless (comic), a 2001 story in Star Wars Tales Volume 3
 Nameless, a 2015 Image Comics miniseries by Chris Burnham and Grant Morrison

Music 
 Nameless (musician) (born 1976), Kenyan pop artist
 The Nameless (album) or the title song, by Cathy Davey, 2010
 "The Nameless" (song), by Slipknot, 2004
 "Nameless", a song by Lil Keed from Keed Talk to 'Em, 2018
 "Nameless", a song by Northlane from Node, 2015
 "Nameless", a song by Staind from Tormented, 1996

Places 
 Nameless, Georgia, US
 Nameless, Tennessee, US
 Nameless, Texas, US
 Nameless Creek, a stream in Indiana, US
 Nameless Island, in the Galapagos Islands, Ecuador
 Nameless Island (Alaska), US
 Nameless Point, on Right Whale Bay, Antarctica

See  also 
 
 Nameless Lake (disambiguation)
 Nameless One (disambiguation)
 Anonymity
 No Name (disambiguation)
 Self-titled
 Untitled (disambiguation)